Château Rouge is a station on Line 4 of the Paris Métro in the 18th arrondissement.

The station opened on 21 April 1908 as part of the first section of the line from Châtelet to Porte de Clignancourt. It is named for the Place du Château Rouge, named for a handsome residence of red bricks built nearby in 1760 and demolished in 1875. The nearby Goutte d'Or district is a vibrant, multicultural area and the Rue Dejean street market operates every day except Monday.

Crime
Since the late 2000s the area is known for pickpocketing and trade of stolen goods, especially mobile phones picked from unaware tourists around Sacré-Cœur and Barbès.

On 20 July 2021, six people were injured after a woman stuck her shopping trolley in the escalator at the station.

Station layout

References

Paris Métro stations in the 18th arrondissement of Paris
Railway stations in France opened in 1908